Charles Douglas Grieve (27 April 1927 – December 1996) was a Scottish trade unionist.

Born in Partick, Grieve worked at the Mitchell factory in Glasgow.  He joined the Tobacco Workers' Union (TWU), and was appointed to the joint post of national organiser and financial secretary.  In October 1969, he succeeded Charles Butler as the union's general secretary.

In 1973, Grieve was elected to the General Council of the Trades Union Congress (TUC), on which he was part of a left-wing group, including Rodney Bickerstaffe, Ken Cameron, Bill Keys, Alan Sapper and Jim Slater.  In 1981, he won election as chair of the Trades Councils Joint Consultative Committee, while, in 1983, he was expected to win election as President of the TUC, but the General Council was reorganised that year, and he lost his seat.

With the decline in tobacco-related employment in the UK, Grieve negotiated the merger of the TWU into the Technical, Administrative and Supervisory Section; once this was completed, in 1986, he retired.

In his spare time, Grieve organised a trade union brass band festival in County Durham, and he devoted much of his retirement to the event. He died in London in 1996.

References

1927 births
1996 deaths
British trade union leaders
Members of the General Council of the Trades Union Congress
People from Partick
Scottish trade unionists
20th-century Scottish people